Willmott Dixon is a privately owned contracting, residential development and property support business.

History 
The company was founded in 1852, by John Willmott. In 2001, Rick Willmott became the fifth generation of the Willmott family to lead the business. In March 2013, Willmott Dixon invested £1 million in the 4Life Academy which is located in Perry Barr, Birmingham.

Operations 
Willmott Dixon has several business streams including construction, residential construction and interior fit out and refurbishment.

Major projects
Major projects involving the company have included:
 Aylesbury Waterside Theatre, completed in 2010
 University of Worcester Arena, completed in 2013
 Woolwich Central, the largest ever development by Tesco's in-house development business Spenhill, was completed in 2014. The development was named Britain's worst new building, being awarded the 'Carbuncle Cup' for a design judges described as "oppressive, defensive, arrogant and inept". The same development was later the subject of £46.7m claim by Tesco against Willmott Dixon for cladding replacement; Willmott Dixon then sought to reclaim the same amount from five members of its supply chain: Lindner Exteriors and its subsidiary Prater, architect Sheppard Robson, AIS Surveyors, and fire engineer AECOM. When the case was heard in February 2023, two suppliers countered by saying the problems arose due to Willmott Dixon's negligence.
 The refurbishment and fit out of the Design Museum in Kensington, completed in 2016
 A specialist building in Exeter, intended to house the Met Office's new supercomputer, completed in 2017
 The redevelopment of Orchard Village in South Hornchurch, completed in 2017. Since its construction, Orchard Village has been beset with problems of build quality and estate management which have been reported in the media, in particular by the Romford Recorder.
 The fit out of the new hospitality suite in the East Stand at Twickenham Stadium, completed in 2018.
 The refurbishment of Alexandra Palace, completed in 2018

The company's development division is the developer of Brentford FC's new Community Stadium at Lionel Road South in Brentford, London, due to complete in 2021. It is also working with Poplar HARCA to redevelop Aberfeldy Village in Poplar, London, due to complete in 2024.

Awards
The company was listed as No. 4 in the East of England Region of the Mid Range businesses of The Sunday Times Best Companies To Work For in July 2019. It also won the Queen's Award for Enterprise in 2014, 2018 and 2019.

References

External links 
 

Construction and civil engineering companies of the United Kingdom
British companies established in 1852
Companies based in North Hertfordshire District
1852 establishments in England
Construction and civil engineering companies established in 1852